Zavratec is a small village southwest of Studenec in the Municipality of Sevnica in east-central Slovenia. The area is part of the historical region of Lower Carniola and is now included in the Lower Sava Statistical Region.

References

External links
Zavratec at Geopedia

Populated places in the Municipality of Sevnica